Below are lists of guests and panelists on Wait Wait... Don't Tell Me!

Note that some guests appear without an explicit promotion despite being affiliated with a news agency, etc.  All guests from the early years of 'Wait Wait' were NPR correspondents and personalities. The following lists contain a list of episodes for that particular year.

 1998
 1999
 2000
 2001
 2002

 2003
 2004
 2005
 2006
 2008

 2009
 2010
 2011
 2012
 2013

 2014
 2015
 2016
 2017
 2018

 2019
 2020
 2021
 2022
 2023

Wait Wait... Don't Tell Me!
Wait Wait
Wait Wait